Kamalapuram is a panchayat in the Khammam district of the Indian state of Telangana. According to the 2011 Indian Census, the sub-district code of the Kamalapuram block is 05224.

Geography 
Kamalapuram is located the middle of the villages of the Yalagondaswamy, with the village of Gattu to the east, Nachepalli to the west, Vanamvari Kistapuram to the north, and Banapuram to the south. The total area of Kamalapuram is 181 km2.

Agriculture and civil affairs 
Agriculture is the main occupation of Kamalapuram residents, with cotton and red chili being the main crops.  of land is currently under cultivation in Kamalapuram. Paddy fields are the most common type of arable land in the region.

People of various castes and religions live in Kamalapuram. The languages most commonly spoken are Telugu and Urdu.

The village has two primary schools: Zilla Parishad School and Anganwadi Centre. Drinking water is supplied from a panchayat-administrated reservoir.

Political Representation 

 Parliament Constituency: Khammam
 Member Of Parliament: Sri Ponguleti Srinivasa Reddy Garu
 Assembly Constituency: Madhira
 MLA : Sri Mallu Bhatti Vikramarka
 Sarpanch: Smt Valluri Varalakshmi Garu
 MPTC: Sri Devarapalli Adinarayana Reddy Garu

Demographics 

The Kamalapuram area hosts a population of 52,168 people. There are 12,664 houses in the sub-district, divided between the 24 villages in the Kamalapuram block.

Villages of Kamalapuram

The 24 villages in Kamalapuram, listed below.

 Kamalapuram
C Gopalapuram 
 Chinnachepalle 
 Dadireddipalle 
 Gangavaram 
 Gollapalle 
 Jambapuram 
 Kamalapuram
 Kokatam 
 Letapalle 
 Mirapuram 
 Nallingayapalle 
 Pachikalapadu 
 Pandillapalle 
 Peddacheppalle 
 Podadurthi 
 Ramachandrapuram 
 Sambatur 
 T Sadipirala 
 Thurakapalle 
 Vankamada 
 Vibharampuram 
 Yellareddipalle 
 Yerragudipadu

References

External links 
Kamalapuram

Villages in Khammam district